"No Quarter" is a song by Led Zeppelin that appears on their 1973 album Houses of the Holy. It was written by John Paul Jones, Jimmy Page, and Robert Plant. The song became a centerpiece at all Led Zeppelin concerts thereafter, until their final tour. It appears in both the film versions and both live album versions of The Song Remains the Same, released in 1976 and expanded in 2007. It appeared once more in 1994 on Page and Plant's reunion album as the title track. It also appears on Led Zeppelin's 2012 live album Celebration Day, which documented their 2007 reunion performance at the O2 Arena in London. It was re-released on the deluxe edition of Houses of the Holy.

Overview
Although an early version was recorded at the Led Zeppelin IV album sessions, "No Quarter" was recorded in 1972 at Island Studios, London. Andy Johns engineered the track and mixed it at Olympic Studios, London. The version that made it onto the album evolved out of a faster version Led Zeppelin had recorded earlier at Headley Grange, an old mansion in east Hampshire, England. Jimmy Page applied vari-speed to drop the whole song a semi-tone, in order to give it a thicker and more intense mood. In addition to the pitch change, the album version featured a very highly compressed guitar track, giving it a tone unique to Led Zeppelin. The guitar solo effect was achieved by direct injection and compression.

The title is derived from the military practice of showing no mercy to a vanquished opponent and from the brave act of not asking for mercy when vanquished. This theme is captured in several of the song's lyrics. Like "Immigrant Song" two albums prior, it evokes imagery from the Vikings and Norse mythology, with lyrics such as “the winds of Thor are blowing cold.”

Record producer Rick Rubin remarked on the song's structure, "It takes such confidence to be able to get really quiet and loose for such a long time. [Led] Zeppelin completely changed how we look at what popular music can be."

Live performances
From 1973, "No Quarter" became a centerpiece at Led Zeppelin concerts, being played at virtually every show the band performed until 1980 (it was eventually discarded on their final tour "Over Europe" in that year).

During live performances, John Paul Jones frequently improvised on keyboards and performed parts of classical music. On the band's ninth North American tour in 1973, performances of the song lasted twice the length of the studio version. On Led Zeppelin's concert tours from 1975 onward, Jones would also play a short piano solo (on a Steinway B-211 grand piano) frequently turning the seven-minute song into a performance exceeding twenty and sometimes even thirty to thirty-five minutes, in a handful of cases. Page and John Bonham would always join him later in the song. He was particularly fond of playing Rachmaninoff pieces, but sometimes included Joaquín Rodrigo's Concierto de Aranjuez and "Amazing Grace" as part of an extended medley.

Reception
In a contemporary review for Houses of the Holy, Gordon Fletcher of Rolling Stone gave "No Quarter" a negative review, describing the track, along with "The Rain Song", as "nothing more than drawn-out vehicles for the further display of Jones' unknowledgeable use of mellotron and synthesizer."

See also
List of cover versions of Led Zeppelin songs"No Quarter" entries

References

Citations

Bibliography

External links
"No Quarter" at ledzeppelin.com

1973 songs
Led Zeppelin songs
Songs written by Jimmy Page
Songs written by Robert Plant
Songs written by John Paul Jones (musician)
Song recordings produced by Jimmy Page
British progressive rock songs
British psychedelic rock songs